Pterothysanus atratus is a moth in the family Callidulidae. It was described by Arthur Gardiner Butler in 1885. It is found in Assam, India.

References

Arctiidae genus list at Butterflies and Moths of the World of the Natural History Museum

Callidulidae
Moths described in 1885